Saltdean is a coastal village in the city of Brighton and Hove, with part (known as East Saltdean) outside the city boundary in Lewes district. It is bordered by farmland and the South Downs National Park.

History

Saltdean was open farmland, originally a part of the village of Rottingdean, and almost uninhabited until 1924 when land was sold off for speculative housing and property development. Some of this was promoted by entrepreneur Charles W. Neville, who had set up a company to develop the site (he also eventually built nearby towns Peacehaven and parts of Rottingdean).

Saltdean has a mainly shingle beach, fronted by a promenade, the Undercliff Walk, which can be reached directly from the cliff top, by steps from the coast road, or by a subway tunnel from the nearby Lido. The Undercliff Walk continues to Brighton, ending by the Palace Pier. The buildings nearest the beach  are the most architecturally varied, and include some influenced by international trends of the inter-war years, e.g. Bauhaus and Cubism, and there are some which are Spanish influenced.

The best known building is the grade II* listed Saltdean Lido community centre, which includes a public library and iconic open air swimming-pool, designed by architect R.W.H. Jones. He also designed other buildings in the area, including the former Grand Ocean Hotel, built using Art Deco 'ocean liner' architecture.

Saltdean is a prosperous village suburb of the city of Brighton and Hove, although its eastern side is administratively part of the neighbouring Lewes District Council.

Geography
Saltdean is situated by the sea in a 'Dean' (Saxon/Old English for 'dry valley'), with the surrounding hills of the South Downs National Park forming a large central dip and valley where the oval shaped Saltdean Park and Lido are located, looking out over the adjacent sea.

Tree lined roads and avenues radiate out in wide oval curves from the park in order to follow the contours of the local topography. The plan of the village was designed from inception to vary considerably from neighbouring Peacehaven's more grid-like system.

Education
The only school in Saltdean is Saltdean Primary School. There is also a library located in the Lido Community building.

Sport and leisure

Saltdean has a non-League football club Saltdean United F.C. who play at Hill Park. Saltdean also has four hard tennis courts, an outdoor Bowls green, a basketball court, and a skateboard park all located within Saltdean Park. A sea swimming group meets weekly on the beach and holds traditional Boxing Day and New Year's Day swims.

Notable people

Historic figures
 Alfred Lynch (1931–2003), actor
 John Nathan-Turner (1947–2002), TV producer
 Manning O'Brine (c.1913-c.1977), writer
 George Robey (1869–1954), music hall comedian

Living people
 Glenn Fabry, comics artist
 John Avon, illustrator
 Dennis Burnett, footballer
 Celeste, singer-songwriter

References

External links

 Saltdean Community Centre - information and resources website
 Community information website
 Parish Church of St Nicholas
Guide to Saltdean House Prices in The Argus

Villages in East Sussex
Areas of Brighton and Hove
Populated coastal places in East Sussex
Beaches of East Sussex
Unparished areas in East Sussex